Bryolymnia is a genus of moths of the family Noctuidae erected by George Hampson in 1908.

Species
 Bryolymnia anthracitaria Ferris & McFarland, 2007
 Bryolymnia atriceps Hampson, 1910
 Bryolymnia bicon (Druce, 1889)
 Bryolymnia biformata Lafontaine & Walsh, 2010
 Bryolymnia castrena E. D. Jones, 1914
 Bryolymnia clarita (Köhler, 1979)
 Bryolymnia dido (Köhler, 1989)
 Bryolymnia ensina (Barnes, 1907)
 Bryolymnia floccifera (Möschler, 1886)
 Bryolymnia forreri (Druce, 1889)
 Bryolymnia haustea Schaus, 1940
 Bryolymnia marginata Schaus, 1911
 Bryolymnia marti Holland, 2010
 Bryolymnia mixta Lafontaine & Walsh, 2010
 Bryolymnia monodonta (Kaye, 1922)
 Bryolymnia nigrescens (Dyar, 1912)
 Bryolymnia picturata (Schaus, 1894)
 Bryolymnia poasia Schaus, 1911
 Bryolymnia roma (Druce, 1894)
 Bryolymnia semifascia (Smith, 1900)
 Bryolymnia strabonis Dognin, 1916
 Bryolymnia viridata (Harvey, 1876)
 Bryolymnia viridimedia (Smith, 1905)

References
 
 Ferris, C. D. & McFarland, N. (2007). Journal of the Lepidopterists' Society 61 (4): 196-198
 

Hadeninae